William Hughes (3 March 1929 – 17 October 2003) was a Scottish footballer who played as a winger.

Career
Born in Glasgow, Hughes played for Newcastle United as an amateur before signing professional terms with York City in May 1951. He was a part of the team which played in the FA Cup semi-final in 1955. He died in West Knapton, North Yorkshire at the age of 74 on 17 October 2003.

References

1929 births
Footballers from Glasgow
2003 deaths
Scottish footballers
Association football wingers
Newcastle United F.C. players
York City F.C. players
English Football League players